I'll Be may refer to:
"I'll Be" (Edwin McCain song)
"I'll Be" (Foxy Brown song)
"I'll Be" (Reba McEntire song)
 I'll Be (album), a 2000 compilation album by Reba McEntire